Hardy C. Powers (1900–1972) was an American minister and general superintendent in the Church of the Nazarene. A native of Texas, Dr. Hardy C. Powers was converted in the Alhambra, California Church of the Nazarene, and took theological training for the ministry at Pasadena College in Pasadena, California. After 12 years in the pastorate and 8 years as superintendent of the Iowa District, Dr. Powers was elected to the general superintendency in 1944, and served in this capacity until his retirement in 1968. He was general superintendent emeritus until his death in 1972.

Powers, Hardy C.
Powers, Hardy C.
American Nazarene ministers
Powers, Hardy C.